"Ignore Me" is a song by Australian singer and songwriter Betty Who, released as the first single in a series of monthly releases, on 19 January 2018. It was released as the lead single from her third studio album, Betty (2019). "Ignore Me" is Betty's first single as an independent artist, after parting the previous year with her former record label, RCA Records.

The video for the song is a choreographed pop pas de deux-style performance starring Betty Who and Canadian-Iranian model/actor Navid Charkhi. The video is notable for being a one shot video, in which continuous action is filmed by a single camera. Who stated in an interview that the official video version was only their third full take of the choreography.

Track listing 
Digital download
 "Ignore Me" – 3:15

References

2018 songs
2018 singles
Betty Who songs
Songs written by Leland (musician)